Crooked Creek Airport  is a public airport located two miles (3 km) south of the central business district of Crooked Creek, in the U.S. state of Alaska.

Although most U.S. airports use the same three-letter location identifier for the FAA and IATA, Crooked Creek Airport is assigned CJX by the FAA and CKD by the IATA.

Facilities 
Crooked Creek Airport has one runway:
 Runway 13/31: 1,997 x 60 ft. (609 x 18 m), surface: gravel/dirt

Airlines and destinations 

Prior to its bankruptcy and cessation of all operations, Ravn Alaska served the airport from multiple locations.

Statistics

References

External links 
 Alaska FAA airport diagram (GIF)
 Resources for this airport:
  	
 
 

Airports in the Bethel Census Area, Alaska